The 1968 Pacific Tigers football team represented the University of the Pacific during the 1968 NCAA University Division football season.

Pacific competed as an independent for the last time in 1968. This concluded twenty straight years as an independent (since the 1949 season). In 1969, Pacific moved to the new Pacific Coast Athletic Association (PCAA). They played home games in Pacific Memorial Stadium in Stockton, California. In their third season under head coach Doug Scovil, the Tigers finished with a record of six wins and four losses (6–4), and outscored their opponents 179–158. This was the first winning season for Pacific since 1961.

Schedule

NFL/AFL Draft
Two Tigers were selected in the 1969 NFL/AFL draft.

The following finished their college career at Pacific, were not drafted, but played in the NFL starting with the  season.

Notes

References

Pacific
Pacific Tigers football seasons
Pacific Tigers football